Asaphodes stephanitis is a species of moth in the family Geometridae. This species is endemic to New Zealand and has been observed in the southern parts of the South Island. this species inhabits coastal sand hills and grassland and is regarded as being rare. Adults are on the wing from January to March.

Taxonomy 
This species was first described by Edward Meyrick in 1907 using specimens collected in Invercargill and named Asaphodes stephanitis. George Hudson discussed and illustrated this species under that name in his 1928 publication The Butterflies and Moths of New Zealand. In 1971 J. S. Dugdale agreed with the placement of this species in the genus Asaphodes. In 1988 J. S. Dugdale again confirmed this placement. The male lectotype specimen, collected at Invercargill, is held at the Natural History Museum, London.

Description

Meyrick described this species as follows:

Distribution
This species is endemic to New Zealand. This species has been collected at its type locality of Invercargill and at locations near Bluff where this species is regarded as being rare.

Habitat 
The preferred habitat of this species is coastal sand hills and grassland.

Behaviour 
The adults of this species are on the wing from January until March.

References 

Larentiinae
Moths described in 1907
Moths of New Zealand
Endemic fauna of New Zealand
Taxa named by Edward Meyrick
Endemic moths of New Zealand